Sargocentron megalops is a species of squirrelfish belonging to the genus of Sargocentron. It is endemic to Pitcairn in the Central Pacific Ocean. It possesses unusually large eyes, which it is named after, and is thought to be used for penetrating deeper water, suggesting 49m could be the near upper limit of the depth range of where it is found.

References

megalops
Fish of the Pacific Ocean
Taxa named by John Ernest Randall